USS PC-1639 was an  in the United States Navy during the Cold War. She was transferred to the Turkish Navy as TCG Demirhisar (P 112) of the Hisar-class patrol boat.

Construction and commissioning 
PC-1639 was laid down in 1963 at Gunderson Brothers Engineering Corps., Portland, Oregon. Launched in 1964.

She was transferred to the Turkish Navy in San Diego and renamed TCG Demirhisar (P 112).

Further reading 

 Navsource.org

References

PC-1638-class submarine chasers
1964 ships
Ships transferred from the United States Navy to the Turkish Navy
Ships built in Portland, Oregon